Following is a list of senators of Yonne, people who have represented the department of Yonne in the Senate of France.

Third Republic

Senators for Yonne under the French Third Republic were:

 Hippolyte Ribière (1876–1885)
 Édouard Charton (1876–1890)
 Jules Guichard (1885–1896)
 Gustave Coste (1890–1900)
 Alexandre Dethou (1892–1896)
 Paul Bezine (1896–1909)
 Charles Laubry (1897–1899)
 Théophile Collinot (1900–1905)
 Félix Lordereau (1900–1909)
 Jean-Baptiste Bienvenu-Martin (1905–1940)
 Félix Besnard (1909–1913)
 Lucien Cornet (1909–1922)
 Marcel Ribière (1913–1922)
 Gaston Gaudaire (1922–1936)
 Henri Hamelin (1922–1940)
 Georges Boully (1936–1940)

Fourth Republic

Senators for Yonne under the French Fourth Republic were:

Fifth Republic 
Senators for Yonne under the French Fifth Republic:

References

Sources

 
Lists of members of the Senate (France) by department